Crommium is an extinct genus of sea snails, marine gastropod molluscs in the family Ampullinidae.

Species
Species within the genus Crommium include:

† Crommium andersoni  Dickerson, 1914
† Crommium angustatum Grateloup, 1828
† Crommium ferrugineum  (Great.)
† Crommium globosa  Perrilliat et al., 2006
† Crommium hosgori  Pacaud, 2016
† Crommium intermedia  Deshayes, 1832
† Crommium masinguiensis  Clark and Durham, 1946
† Crommium palmasensis  Clark and Durham, 1946
† Crommium palmerae  Clark and Durham, 1946
† Crommium perovatum  Conrad, 1846
† Crommium pinyonensis  Dickerson, 1914
† Crommium pseudowillemeti  Eames, 1952
† Crommium rouaulti  d'Archiac and Haime, 1854
† Crommium willemettii  Deshayes, 1825

Fossils of the sea snails within this genus have been found in sediments of Europe, United States, Colombia, Somalia and Nigeria from Paleocene to Eocene (age range: 61.7 to 23.03 million years ago).

References

 "I molluschi dei terreni terziarii del Piemonte e della Liguria"

Ampullinidae
Paleocene first appearances
Eocene genus extinctions
Prehistoric gastropod genera